Elton John One Night Only – The Greatest Hits is a live album released by English musician Elton John in 2000. The album was recorded on 20 and 21 October 2000 at Madison Square Garden. An extended version was also released as a DVD, entitled One Night Only: The Greatest Hits Live at Madison Square Garden. While the album is called "One Night Only," it was in fact recorded over two nights. Due to technical issues on the first night, most of the recordings were drawn from the second show. In the US, it was certified gold in July 2001 by the RIAA.

Track listing

CD release
All compositions by Elton John and Bernie Taupin, except as indicated.

 "Goodbye Yellow Brick Road" – 3:18
 "Philadelphia Freedom" – 5:21
 "Don't Go Breaking My Heart" – 4:19 (Ann Orson/Carte Blanche)
 With Kiki Dee
 "Rocket Man (I Think it's Gonna be a Long, Long Time)" – 5:43
 "Crocodile Rock" – 4:13
 "Sacrifice" – 5:20
 "Can You Feel the Love Tonight" – 3:59 (Elton John/Tim Rice)
 "Bennie and the Jets" – 5:02
 "Your Song" – 4:17
 With Ronan Keating
 "Sad Songs (Say So Much)" – 3:54
 With Bryan Adams
 "Candle in the Wind" – 3:45
 "Saturday Night's Alright for Fighting" – 4:38
 With Anastacia
 "I'm Still Standing" – 3:04
 "Don't Let the Sun Go Down on Me" – 5:59
 "I Guess That's Why They Call It the Blues" – 5:10 (John/Davey Johnstone/Bernie Taupin)
 With Mary J. Blige

DVD release
 "Funeral for a Friend/Love Lies Bleeding"
 "Candle in the Wind"
 "Bennie and the Jets"
 "Goodbye Yellow Brick Road" (with Billy Joel)
 "Someone Saved My Life Tonight"
 "Little Jeannie"
 "Philadelphia Freedom"
 "Tiny Dancer"
 "Can You Feel the Love Tonight"
 "Daniel"
 "Rocket Man"
 "Club at the End of the Street"
 "Blue Eyes"
 "I Guess That's Why They Call It the Blues" (with Mary J. Blige)
 "The One"
 "I Don't Wanna Go on with You Like That"
 "Sorry Seems to Be the Hardest Word"
 "Sacrifice"
 "Come Together"
 "Your Song" (with Ronan Keating)
 "Sad Songs (Say So Much)" (with Bryan Adams)
 "I'm Still Standing"
 "Crocodile Rock"
 "Saturday Night's Alright for Fighting" (with Anastacia)
 "The Bitch is Back"
 "Don't Let the Sun Go Down on Me"
 "Don't Go Breaking My Heart" (with Kiki Dee)

Extras
 "I Want Love" (video featuring Robert Downey Jr.)
 "This Train Don't Stop There Anymore" (video featuring Justin Timberlake)
 "Original Sin" (video featuring Mandy Moore & Elizabeth Taylor)
 "Sorry Seems to Be the Hardest Word" (video featuring Blue)
 "Original Sin" (Dan-O-Rama video remix)

Personnel
Elton John - piano, vocals
Davey Johnstone - guitar, vocals
John Jorgenson - guitar, mandolin, pedal steel guitar, saxophone, vocals
Bob Birch - bass guitar, vocals
Guy Babylon - keyboards, vocals
Nigel Olsson - drums, percussion, vocals
Curt Bisquera - drums
John Mahon - percussion, vocals
Michael Healea - percussion, playback tracks
Ken Stacey - background vocals, additional guitar
Billy Trudel - background vocals

Certifications

Album

Video

References

Albums produced by Phil Ramone
2000 live albums
2000 video albums
Elton John live albums
Elton John video albums
Live video albums
Albums recorded at Madison Square Garden
The Rocket Record Company live albums